The 1983 Andorran local elections were held on 12 December. Voters elected the council members of the seven parishes of Andorra. For first time since 1867, local elections were not hold on the same day as parliamentary elections. This was also the first time that the totality of the council seats were up for election (between 1867 and 1979 only half of the seats were renewed in each election).

Electoral system
A referendum was held in 1982 to choose a new election system, but any option had a majority of the votes, and therefore the traditional majority system remained.

Candidates were elected using a two-round plurality-at-large voting system with open lists. As parties were not legalised until 1993, all the lists were officially labelled as independent, although media classified them as government endorsed (if the list was supported by the outgoing government) or opposition (if candidates were part of the opposition). After the elections, the parish councils elected the consol major (mayor) and the cònsol menor (deputy mayor), which normally were the top candidates of the winning list.

Candidates
In Canillo and Sant Julià de Lòria only one list was running. In la Massana, the top candidate of both lists was the same person.

Candidates by parish. The two top candidates are listed for each list:
 Canillo
Government endorsed: Xavier Jordana, Joan Puigfernal
Opposition: Miquel Naudi, Daniel Mateu
Encamp
Enric Pujal, Josep Dalleres
Ordino
Government endorsed: Joan Solana, Pere Babi
Opposition: Julià Vila, Pere Riba
La Massana
Bonaventura Mora, Candi Naudi
Bonaventura Mora, Jordi Font
Andorra la Vella
Government endorsed: Manuel Pons, Antoni Cerqueda
Opposition: Jordi Farràs, Jaume Bartumeu
Sant Julià de Lòria
 Josep Maria Felipó, Alfredo Figueredo
Escaldes-Engordany
Government endorsed:  Joan Nadal, Serafí Miró
Opposition: José María Beal, Miquel Aleix

Results
Turnout was 77.7%, 14.6 pp higher than in the previous election. Turnout was lower in the parishes with only one candidacy (59% in Encamp and 66% in Sant Julià de Lòria). All candidates were elected on the first round.

Results by parish:

References

1983
1983 elections in Europe
1983 in Andorra